Frank De Mulder (born 22 August 1963 in Ghent) is a Belgian photographer.

Early life
De Mulder got his first camera from his father at the age of 12 and became soon addicted to the “silver” image in the darkroom.
At 17 he started to copy the photos of David Hamilton, invested all  his pocket money in photo equipment and learned by books the world of light and photography.
He studied film direction at RITCS.

in Brussels and continued his studies in Ghent at KASK, where he graduated cum laude.

Career
The leading Belgian Fine Art photographer Frank De Mulder is a celebrated personality within the international photo scene. He has worked for large advertising campaigns and well-known magazines, including Playboy, FHM, GQ, Maxim and Elle.

De Mulder's most intriguing work, however, are the intimate impressions of female emotions and beauty. De Mulder released 5 books with the renowned publishing group teNeues: SENSES (2007), PURE (2010), GLORIOUS (2013), HEAVEN (2015) and TRIBUTE (2017).

The images are never provocative, but they tend to balance on the edge of what is forbidden. That balance is what makes the photographs so powerful and interesting. De Mulder shows us the delicate sensual world of women—from fragile and emotional to flamboyant and erotic—always at the highest level of beauty.

Frank De Mulder was born 22 August 1963 in Ghent, Belgium. Already as a young boy he was fascinated by image, light and beauty. He got his first camera from his father at the age of 12. At 17 he started to copy the pictures of David Hamilton, invested all his pocket money in photo equipment and learned by books the world of light and photography. He studied film direction at RITCS in Brussels and continued his studies in Ghent at the Royal Art Academy, where he graduated cum laude. Frank did his army service in the cinematography division where he made several “war movies” for military trainings.

He started his career as cameraman and director of photography in several short movies and commercials. At the age of 29 he decided photography was his real passion. Since then, he worked his way up to become a worldwide celebrated photographer, represented by teNeues Publishers. At his side there is always Michèle van Damme, his associate. “It takes two to tango”. Michèle is responsible for art direction and digital postproduction. Together they built in total 3 studios, the third one in Merelbeke near Ghent.

With his nude portraits, the Belgian Frank de Mulder is considered the successor to the great Helmut Newton: his pictures contain a peculiar tension and tell small stories.

The Belgian Frank de Mulder is one of the best-known representatives of upscale erotic photography.  His nude portraits move in the tradition of Helmut Newton: aesthetic, stylish pictures, mostly in black and white, which are not primarily concerned with serving the viewer's voyeurism.  Rather, de Mulder creates a special atmosphere in each picture and gives the scenes a crackling tension.  He expresses his concept as follows: "An erotic picture should tell a story. The viewer has to believe what he sees in the picture. If I achieve that, I will be successful."

Source: Stern

The publication of his first book « Senses » with teNeues publishers in 2007 was his breakthrough with the general public.

With 6 books up until know he is one of the most successful photographers of erotic work

Exhibitions
 2006 - Eccentric, Knokke, Belgium - Frank De Mulder/Roger Raveel
 2007 - Eccentric, Knokke, Belgium
 2012 - Eccentric, Knokke, Belgium
 2013 - Art depot, Bonheiden, Belgium
 2013 - Art Gallery Ludwig Lefevere
 2014 - Modernbook gallery, San Francisco, USA
 2014 - Expo Hotel Stories in CODA Apeldoorn
 2014 - Art Miami, Miami, USA
 2014 - Gallerie Kronsbein, Munich, Germany
 2014 - The Wilde Side Gallery, Antwerp, Belgium
 2015 - Eccentric, Knokke, Belgium
 2018 - Akademy, Kortrijk, Belgium

Bibliography
 FotoArt, 1999, She, 80 pages 25x33cm, 
 teNeues, 2007, Senses, 168 pages 27.5x37cm, 
 teNeues, 2010, Pure, 168 pages 27.5x37cm, 
 teNeues, 2013, Glorious, 168 pages  28.7x37.6 cm, 
 teNeues, 2015, Heaven, 168 pages  27.9 x 38.1 cm, 
 teNeues, 2017, Tribute, 256 pages  29.8 x 38.1 cm,

References

Further reading
 Focus
 Stern
 Esquire
 Stern
 GVA
 Style
 klassikmagazine.com
 normalacademy.com
 books-teneues.com
 Het Laatste Nieuws
 Whatmatters
 boek.be
 Photography-now
 Fotohennyhoogeveen
 Eric Tonen books
 Nieuwsblad
 Curateart
 Maxim
 Mastersofphotography.wordpress.com/
 residence.nl
 fotocultmatazin.com

External links

 
 Video
 Video Fine Art Limited Editions
 Video Frank de Mulder : Dans les coulisses du travail le plus sexy du monde
 TRIBUTE by Frank De Mulder
 LOVE HOTEL by Frank De Mulder and Michèle Van Damme

Living people
Belgian photographers
Artists from Ghent
Belgian erotic photographers
1963 births
Nude photography